This is a list of football (soccer) clubs in Saint Kitts and Nevis.

 BAS Stoney Grove Strikers
 Bath United
 Beyond Homes All Stars
 BT Cotton Ground United
 Cayon Rockets
 Combined Schools
 Garden Hotspurs FC
 Newtown United FC
 SL Horsford Highlights
 St Paul's United
 St. Peters Strikers FC
 Stones United
 Villa International United
 Village Superstars F.C.

Saint Kitts and Nevis
 
Football clubs

Football clubs